Messenger is Edwin McCain's third major-label album, released on June 15, 1999. It was recorded at Tree Sound Studios & Southern Tracks in Atlanta, and Record Plant Studios in Los Angeles, and released by Lava Records.

Track listing
All tracks composed by McCain except "A Prayer to St. Peter," composed by John Gorka (actually called "Let Them In" on his 2001 CD entitled The Company You Keep),  and "I Could Not Ask for More" composed by Diane Warren.
 "Wish in This World" - 3:43
 "Beautiful Life" - 5:04
 "Promise of You" - 5:31
 "Ghosts of Jackson Square" - 4:14
 "I Could Not Ask for More" - 4:35
 "Do Your Thing" - 4:33
 "A Prayer to St. Peter" - 3:43
 "Go Be Young" - 3:43
 "Anything Good About Me" - 3:47
 "I'll Be (Acoustic Version)" - 4:35
 "Sign on the Door" - 5:58
 "See Off This Mountain" - 7:00

Charts
Album

Singles

Notes 

1999 albums
Edwin McCain albums
Lava Records albums
Albums produced by Matt Serletic